Tõnu Loik (19 November 1875 Einmanni Parish, Järva County – ?) was an Estonian politician. He was a member of Estonian Constituent Assembly.

References

1875 births
Members of the Estonian Constituent Assembly
Year of death missing